Darreh Saki-ye Sofla (also Romanized as Darreh Sākī-ye Soflá) is a village in Dehpir-e Shomali Rural District, in the Central District of Khorramabad County, Lorestan Province, Iran. At the 2006 census, its population was 169, in 34 families.

References 

Towns and villages in Khorramabad County